Guru Prasanna Singh (3 January 1922 – 5 October 2013) was the Chief Justice of the Madhya Pradesh High Court from 1978 to 1984. He was the acting Governor of Madhya Pradesh briefly twice, in 1981 and 1983. Later, he  was the Chairman, Madhya Pradesh Law Commission from 1990 to 1992  and the Lokayukt, of Madhya Pradesh from 1992 to 1997.

See also
List of Governors of Madhya Pradesh

References

Governors of Madhya Pradesh
Judges of the Madhya Pradesh High Court
1922 births
2013 deaths
20th-century Indian judges